Competition Aircraft Inc, founded in 1980 by Jack Venaleck, is an American manufacturer of composite propellers for ultralight aircraft. The company headquarters is located in Grass Valley, California.

Competition Aircraft started as a subsidiary of Associated Enterprises of Painesville, Ohio. The company started producing aircraft propellers in 1983 under the Ultra-Prop brand. The company produces propellers with up to six blades.

See also
List of aircraft propeller manufacturers

References

External links 

Companies established in 1980
Aircraft propeller manufacturers
Aerospace companies of the United States